Bhupal Nobles University  also known as BN University is a private university located in Udaipur, Rajasthan, India.It was founded in 2017

References

External links
 

Educational institutions established in 2017
Private universities in India
2017 establishments in Rajasthan